The ariary (sign: Ar; ISO 4217 code MGA) is the currency of Madagascar. It is notionally subdivided into 5 iraimbilanja and is one of only two non-decimal currencies currently circulating (the other is the Mauritanian ouguiya). The names ariary and iraimbilanja derive from the pre-colonial currency, with ariary (from the Spanish word "real") being the name for a silver dollar. Iraimbilanja means literally "one iron weight" and was the name of an old coin worth  of an ariary.  However, as of 2021 the unit is effectively obsolete, since one iraimbilanja is worth less than US$0.005 and the coins have fallen into disuse.

History
The ariary was introduced in 1961. It was equal to 5 Malagasy francs. Coins and banknotes were issued denominated in both francs and ariary, with the sub-unit of the ariary, the iraimbilanja, worth  of an ariary and therefore equal to the franc. The ariary replaced the franc as the official currency of Madagascar on January 1, 2005.

Coins and banknotes were denominated in both the official francs and the semi-official ariary and iraimbilanja since 1961. On early issues, the franc denomination was the most prominent. However, from 1978, higher value coins were issued denominated only in ariary. In 1993, new 500 ariary-2500 franc note and 5000 ariary-25,000 franc were issued with ariary slightly more prominent. On banknotes issued since July 31, 2003, the ariary denomination is displayed prominently and the franc denomination in small print. Lower denomination coins are also now issued denominated in ariary but with the main design unchanged.

Coins

In 1965, 1 franc (1 iraimbilanja) and 2 francs (venty sy kirobo) coins were issued, followed by 5 francs (1 ariary) in 1966 and 10 and 20 francs (2 and 4 ariary) in 1970.

In 1978, 10 and 20 ariary coins were issued which did not show the denomination in francs. These were followed in 1992 by 5 and 50 ariary coins as well as smaller 10 and 20 ariary. In 2003–2004, 1 and 2 ariary coins not bearing the franc denomination were also introduced.

Coins in circulation are listed below. Bold denotes the most prominent denomination, while italic denotes an equivalence that is not shown on the coin.

Banknotes
In 1961, the Institut d'Émission Malgache (Malagasy Issuing Institute) introduced banknotes in denominations of 50, 100, 500, 1000 and 5000 francs. These notes were overprints on earlier notes of the Bank of Madagascar and Comoros, with the denomination in ariary (10, 20, 100, 200 and 1000) included in the overprint. Regular banknotes in the same denominations followed between 1963 and 1969. The denomination in ariary was written only in words, not numerals.

On 12 June 1973, the Banky Foiben’ny Repoblika Malagasy (Central Bank of the Malagasy Republic) was created by Ordinance No. 73-025, taking over the functions of the Institut d’Émission Malgache, including the issuance of banknotes. In 1974 new notes were issued in the same denominations as had been used earlier.

In December 1975, a draft constitution was overwhelmingly approved in a referendum, and the Second Malagasy Republic, to be called the Repoblica Demokratika Malagasy (Democratic Republic of Madagascar), was proclaimed. As a result of the change in the country's name, the former Banky Foiben’ny Repoblika Malagasy was renamed Banky Foiben’i Madagasikara (Central Bank of Madagascar). resulting in a new series of notes which included 10,000 francs (2000 ariary) notes but did not include 50 or 100 francs.

In 1993, notes for 500 ariary and 5000 ariary were introduced which bore the ariary denominations in numerals as well as the franc denominations (2500 and 25,000) in smaller numerals. However, in 1998, these notes were replaced by new issues which only gave the franc denominations in numerals.

In 2003–2004, new notes were introduced in denominations of 100, 200, 500, 1000, 2000, 5000 and 10,000 ariary. These notes also bear the franc denominations on notes up to 1000 ariary (500, 1000, 2500, 5000) in very small numerals.

In 2017, the Bank Foiben’i Madagasikara (Central Bank of Madagascar) introduced a new family of banknotes. The new series of notes, like its previous series, remains "Madagascar and its Riches", highlighting its economic activities, biodiversity, culture and tourist sites. Part of this series includes a new denomination, 20,000 ariary. The first four denominations in this series, 2,000, 5,000, 10,000 and 20,000 ariary were issued on July 17, 2017. The four other denominations, 100, 200, 500 and 1,000 ariary, were issued on September 17, 2017.

Banknotes currently in circulation are listed below.

See also
 Economy of Madagascar

References

External links
 Historical and current banknotes of Madagascar 

Currencies of Madagascar
Currencies introduced in 1961